Deatsville is a town in Elmore County, Alabama, United States. Although Deatsville initially incorporated in 1903, it lapsed at some point after the 1910 U.S. Census and did not appear again as incorporated until 2000. As of the 2020 census, the population was 1,679,

Geography
Deatsville is located in western Elmore County and eastern Autauga County at  (32.593958, -86.393454). It is bordered to the west by Autauga County and to the south by the city of Millbrook.

Alabama State Route 143 passes through the center of Deatsville, leading northwest  to Clanton and southeast  to Elmore.

Demographics

At the 2000 census there were 340 people, 130 households, and 101 families in the town. The racial makeup of the town was 97.35% White, 1.47% Black or African American, 0.59% from other races, and 0.59% from two or more races.
Of the 130 households 33.8% had children under the age of 18 living with them, 70.0% were married couples living together, 3.8% had a female householder with no husband present, and 22.3% were non-families. 18.5% of households were one person and 10.0% were one person aged 65 or older. The average household size was 2.62 and the average family size was 2.99.

The age distribution was 24.4% under the age of 18, 6.8% from 18 to 24, 29.1% from 25 to 44, 25.9% from 45 to 64, and 13.8% 65 or older. The median age was 40 years. For every 100 females, there were 104.8 males. For every 100 females age 18 and over, there were 110.7 males.

The median household income was $40,938 and the median family income  was $48,295. Males had a median income of $31,000 versus $21,875 for females. The per capita income for the town was $16,409. None of the families and 0.9% of the population were living below the poverty line, including no under eighteens and 3.4% of those over 64.

2010 census
At the 2010 census there were 1,154 people, 328 households, and 190 families in the town. The racial makeup of the town was 77.6% White, 19.4% Black or African American, 0.3% from other races, and 2.3% from two or more races.
Of the 328 households 48.6% had children under the age of 18 living with them, 71.9% were married couples living together, 8.4% had a female householder with no husband present, and 16.1% were non-families. 14.6% of households were one person and 5.9% were one person aged 65 or older. The average household size was 2.95 and the average family size was 3.28.

The age distribution was 32.9% under the age of 18, 6.1% from 18 to 24, 31.9% from 25 to 44, 22.5% from 45 to 64, and 6.6% 65 or older. The median age was 34 years. For every 100 females, there were 93.0 males. For every 100 females age 18 and over, there were 92.3 males.

The median household income was $59,853 and the median family income  was $68,929. Males had a median income of $59,125 versus $26,250 for females. The per capita income for the town was $23,376. None of the families and 0.2% of the population were living below the poverty line, including no under eighteens and 0% of those over 64.

Education
It is in the Elmore County Public School System.

Notable people 

Dee Milliner, NFL Player

References

External links
 Elmore County Economic Development Authority
 

Towns in Elmore County, Alabama
Towns in Alabama
Montgomery metropolitan area